The Kaigetsudō school (懐月堂派, -ha) was a school of ukiyo-e painting and printmaking founded in Edo around 1700–1714. It is often said that the various Kaigetsudō artists' styles are so similar, many scholars find it nearly impossible to differentiate them; thus, many Kaigetsudō paintings are attributed to the school's founder, Kaigetsudō Ando, which may have been in fact painted by his disciples.

The school's founder, Ando Yasunori, known by his art-name (gō) Kaigetsudō Ando, was a specialist in bijinga, images of beautiful women. Unlike his disciples, Ando produced only paintings, never prints. His style, and that of the school, draws strongly upon the style of the Torii school, which is known primarily for its theater signboards. The style of both schools is distinguished by its use of thick lines and bright colors. However, the Kaigetsudō style is said to depict subjects in a very stereotyped manner, which is in sharp contrast to the style of the Torii school.

The Kaigetsudō artists are known primarily for their prints of bijin with very colorful and complex patterns on their kimono. While these images may be seen as displaying fashion designs, it is far more likely that the artists intended to focus on the beauty and grace of the women themselves. The printmakers sought to share the fame and magnificence of the women of the Yoshiwara with those unable to afford to experience the ukiyo (Floating World) in person.

While the school produced many unique works, many were based on reproducing very similar poses or images, with only the colors or kimono pattern changed.

Though a handful of artists took on the Kaigetsudō name for themselves, and sought to imitate the style, the work of Kaigetsudō Ando's direct disciples fell into sharp decline after his banishment to Ōshima in 1714.

Significant artists of the Kaigetsudō school
Kaigetsudō Ando – founder of the school
Kaigetsudō Anchi
Kaigetsudō Dohan
Kaigetsudō Doshin
Kaigetsudō Doshu
Kaigetsudō Doshū
Matsuno Chikanobu
Tōsendō Rifū
Takizawa Shigenobu
Baiyūken Katsunobu
Baiōken Eishun (a.k.a. Baiōken Nagaharu, Takeda Harunobu)

References
Frederic, Louis (2002). Japan Encyclopedia. Cambridge, Massachusetts: Harvard University Press.
Paine, Robert Treat and Alexander Soper (1955). The Art and Architecture of Japan. New Haven: Yale University Press.

External links
Bridge of dreams: the Mary Griggs Burke collection of Japanese art, a catalog from The Metropolitan Museum of Art Libraries (fully available online as PDF), which contains material on this school (see index)